Louis-Nicolas d'Avout (10 May 1770 – 1 June 1823), better known as Davout, 1st Duke of Auerstaedt, 1st Prince of Eckmühl, was a French military commander and Marshal of the Empire who served during both the French Revolutionary Wars and the Napoleonic Wars. His talent for war, along with his reputation as a stern disciplinarian, earned him the nickname "The Iron Marshal" (Le Maréchal de fer). He is ranked along with Marshals André Masséna and Jean Lannes as one of Napoleon's finest commanders. His loyalty and obedience to Napoleon were absolute. During his lifetime, Davout's name was commonly spelled Davoust - this spelling appears on the Arc de Triomphe and in much of the correspondence between Napoleon and his generals.

Biography

Davout was born in the small village Annoux (Yonne) as the eldest son of Jean-François d'Avout (1739–1779), a cavalry officer and his wife (married in 1768) Françoise-Adélaïde Minard de Velars (1741–1810). He was of (poor) noble descent but educated in the nearby Brienne-le-Chateau, which had a military academy also attended by Napoleon, before also transferring to the École Militaire in Paris on 29 September 1785. He graduated on 19 February 1788 and was appointed a sous-lieutenant in the Royal-Champagne Cavalry Regiment in garrison at Hesdin (Pas-de-Calais). On the outbreak of the French Revolution, Davout embraced its principles. He was chef de bataillon in a volunteer corps in the campaign of 1792, and distinguished himself at the Battle of Neerwinden the following spring. He had just been promoted to general of brigade when he was removed from the active list because of his noble birth. After he divorced his wife in 1794 he served in the Rhine campaign of 1796, and accompanied General Louis Desaix in the Egyptian expedition of Napoleon Bonaparte.

On his return, he did not take part in the Battle of Marengo, where his friend Desaix was killed while making a decisive contribution to the victory. At the ascension of Napoleon as emperor in 1804, Davout was named as one of the original 18 Marshals of the Empire. Davout was the youngest and least experienced the generals promoted to marshal, which earned him the hostility of other generals throughout his career. On 18 June 1805 he was present at the Battle of Blanc-Nez and Gris-Nez after joining a Batavian flotilla, headed for Boulogne, as an observer. As commander of the III Corps of the Grande Armée, Davout rendered his greatest services. At the Battle of Austerlitz, following a forced march of 48 hours to fall on the left flank of the Russian army, the III Corps bore the brunt of the allies' attack. In the subsequent War of the Fourth Coalition, Davout, with a single corps, with the intention to fall on the Prussian left wing, fought and won the Battle of Auerstädt against the main Prussian Army,  under the Duke of Brunswick, which had more than twice as many soldiers at its disposal (more than 63,000, to Davout's 28,000). Historian François-Guy Hourtoulle writes: "At Jena, Napoleon won a battle he could not lose. At Auerstädt, Davout won a battle he could not win". As a reward, Napoleon let Davout and his men enter Berlin first on 25 October 1806.

Davout added to his renown in the battles of Eylau and Friedland. Napoleon left him as governor-general of the newly created Duchy of Warsaw following the Treaties of Tilsit in 1807, and the next year awarded him with the title of Duke of Auerstädt. During the War of the Fifth Coalition in 1809, Davout took part in the Battle of Eckmühl, and also distinguished himself in the Battle of Wagram, where he commanded the right wing. He was later made Prince of Eckmühl following the campaign. In 1810 Davout travelled to Compiègne with Napoleon to collect the 18-year-old bride Marie-Louise of Austria. Davout was entrusted by Napoleon with the task of organizing the "corps of observation of the Elbe", which would become the gigantic army with which Napoleon invaded Russia in 1812. In this, he commanded the I Corps, the strongest corps, numbering over 70,000. On 1 July he left Vilnius. On the order of Napoleon Davout secretly took over the command Jérôme Bonaparte, occupied Minsk but had lost a third of his men due to sickness and desertion. He defeated the Russians at Mohilev before he joined the main army at Smolensk, with which he continued throughout the campaign. During the retreat from Moscow he conducted the rear guard, which was deemed too slow by the emperor, and was replaced by Marshal Michel Ney in the Battle of Vyazma. His inability to hold out at the Battle of Krasnoi, he was threatened with destruction, until the arrival of Ney. Among the booty captured by the Russians were Davout's war chest, a plethora of maps of the Middle East, Central Asia and India, and Davout's Marshal baton. The loss of his baton led him into disgrace and he would not meet with the emperor again until his return from Elba.

In April 1813, Davout commanded the Hamburg military district. (The French had initially been driven out by the Russians in March 1813.) He defended the poorly fortified and provisioned city, through the long Siege of Hamburg, only surrendering on direct order by King Louis XVIII, who had come to the throne after Napoleon's abdication in April 1814. The French restored their authority with many reprisals among the population. During the siege, he expelled up to 25,000 of Hamburg's poorest citizens out of the city into the cold winter, many of whom perished of cold and starvation. Between 1806 and 1814, when the French occupation came to an end by Davout's surrender, the population decreased by nearly one-half, to 55,000. 

 
Davout's military character has been interpreted as cruel and he had to defend himself against many attacks upon his conduct at Hamburg. He was a stern disciplinarian, who exacted rigid and precise obedience from his troops, and consequently his corps was more trustworthy and exact in the performance of its duty than any other. For example, Davout forbade his troops from plundering enemy villages, a policy he would enforce by the use of the death penalty. Thus, in the early days of the Grande Armée, the III corps tended to be entrusted with the most difficult work. He was regarded by his contemporaries as one of the ablest of Napoleon's marshals. Upon the first restoration of the Bourbon monarchy, he retired into private life, openly displaying his hostility to the Bourbons, and when Napoleon returned from Elba, Davout rejoined him.

Appointed Minister of War, he reorganized the French Army insofar as time permitted, and he was so indispensable to the war department that Napoleon kept him in Paris during the Waterloo campaign. To what degree his skill and bravery would have altered the fortunes of the campaign of 1815 can only be surmised, but Napoleon has been criticized for his failure to avail himself in the field of the services of the best general he then possessed.

Davout directed the gallant, but hopeless, defence of Paris after the Battle of Waterloo. He received the command of the army assembled under the walls of Paris, and would have fought, had he not received the order of the provisional government to negotiate with the enemy. On 24 June 1815, Davout was sent by Joseph Fouché, the president of the provisional government, to the dethroned emperor at the Élysée Palace with a request to quit Paris, where his continued presence could lead to trouble and public danger. Napoleon received him coldly but left Paris the next day and resided at Malmaison until 29 June when he departed for Rochfort. In later years, Napoleon said of Davout bitterly that "he betrayed me too. He has a wife and children; he thought that all was lost; he wanted to keep what he had got," while on another occasion he remarked that, "I thought that Davout loved me, but he loved only France." Subsequently, Davout retired with the army beyond the Loire and made his submission to the restored Bourbon monarchy on 14 July, and within a few days gave up his command to Marshal Jacques MacDonald. Davout was exiled to Louviers on 27 December 1815. 

He was deprived of his titles upon the second restoration. When some of his subordinate generals were proscribed, he demanded to be held responsible for their acts, as executed under his orders, and he endeavoured to prevent the condemnation of Ney. After half a year, the hostility of the Bourbons towards Davout faded and he became reconciled to the monarchy. In 1817, his rank and titles were restored and in 1819, he became a member of the Chamber of Peers.

In 1822, Davout was elected mayor of Savigny-sur-Orge, a position he held for a year. His son Louis-Napoléon was also mayor of the city from 1843 to 1846. A main square bears their name in the city, as does a boulevard in Paris.

Davout died on 1 June 1823. His remains rest in the Père Lachaise Cemetery, where an elaborate tomb marks his grave.

Honours and awards

Davout held the following honours and awards:
 Knight Grand Cross of the Order of the Legion of Honour
 Knight of the Order of the Iron Crown
 Grand Cross and Star of the Virtuti Militari
 Knight Grand Cross of the Order of the White Eagle
 Knight of the Order of Christ
 Knight Grand Cross of the Military Order of St. Henry
 Knight Grand Cross of the Military Order of Max Joseph
 Knight Grand Cross of the Royal Order of St. Stephen of Hungary
 Knight of the Military Order of Maria Theresa
 Knight Grand Cross of the Order of the Elephant

Personal life

Davout was known as a methodical person in both military and personal affairs. Within the army and among his social peers, he was often considered cold and distant; while respected, he was not well-liked. During times of peace, he preferred to spend time with his family and care for his home, rather than cultivate his high social standing.

Because of his stubborn personality and limited social skills, he developed many enemies and antagonists within the army's officer corps, notably Jean-Baptiste Bernadotte, Joachim Murat (with whom he clashed strongly during the 1812 campaign), Louis-Alexandre Berthier and Baron Thiébault (who would harshly criticize Davout in his memoirs).

Perhaps his fiercest anger was directed towards Bernadotte, who he perceived to have failed to come to his aid at Auerstadt, though close enough to observe the smoke and hear the cannon fire. His anger was so intense that Davout requested to settle the matter with a personal duel, averted only by Napoléon's personal intervention. Bernadotte was eventually sent back to Paris in disgrace after being caught by Napoleon retreating without orders at the battle of Wagram.  Bernadotte then caught the eye of the Swedish ambassador, looking for a well-connected French officer to take on the role of heir to the Swedish throne.  When Sweden threw in her lot against Napoleon in the War of the Sixth Coalition, Davout personally asked to be placed opposite Bernadotte's contingent, in order to gain retribution for the latter's betrayal. But with Davout assigned to defend Hamburg (which he did, up to and beyond Napoleon's abdication), they never did face each other in battle.

Of the other Marshals, Davout had the best relations with Michel Ney, Nicolas Charles Oudinot and Laurent Gouvion Saint-Cyr. His best friend was possibly Charles-Étienne Gudin de La Sablonnière, one of his subordinates, who was killed in battle in 1812.

Family

Davout was also noted for his loyalty to his long-time second wife Louise Aimée Julie Davout (née Leclerc, sister of Charles Leclerc and sister-in-law of Pauline Bonaparte) (Pontoise, 19 June 1782Paris, 17 December 1868), whom he married in 1801 and who remained with him until his death. Their marriage was loving and the couple seem to have been faithful to each other despite very long periods of separation. They had eight children, four of whom died in childhood:
Paul (1802–1803)
Joséphine (1804–1805)
Antoinette Joséphine (180519 August 1821), married in 1820 to Achille, Comte Félix-Vigier (1801–1868)
Adèle Napoleone (June 180721 January 1885), married on 14 March 1827 to Étienne, Comte de Cambacérès (180420 December 1878)
Napoleon (1809–1810)
Napoleon Louis, 2nd Duke of Auerstedt, 2nd and last Prince of Eckmühl (6 January 181113 June 1853), who died unmarried and without issue
Jules (1812–1813)
Adelaide-Louise (8 July 18156 October 1892), married on 17 August 1835 to François-Edmond de Couliboeuf, Marquis de Blocqueville (1789–1861)
The title of duke went to the descendants of Louis-Nicolas' brother Charles Isidor (1774–1854) by his marriage in 1824 to Claire de Cheverry (1804–1895). He also had a sister Julie (1771–1846), married in 1801 to Marc-Antoine Bonnin de La Bonninière, 1st Count de Beaumont (1763–1830), and another brother, Alexandre-Louis-Edme, 1st Baron d'Avout (1773–1820), married in 1808 to Alire Parisot (1786–1856).
The youngest daughter, Adelaide-Louise, marquise de Blocqueville, left provision in her will for the name of her father to be given to a lighthouse. In 1897, the Phare d'Eckmühl was opened on the headland of Penmarc'h in Brittany.

References

Further reading
 Potocka-Wąsowiczowa, Anna z Tyszkiewiczów. Wspomnienia naocznego świadka. Warszawa: Państwowy Instytut Wydawniczy, 1965.

External links
Davout and Napoleon:A Study of Their Personal Relationship By John Gallaher for the International Napoleonic Society
 Souvenir du Maréchal Davout

1770 births
1823 deaths
Burials at Père Lachaise Cemetery
Commanders in the French Imperial Guard
Dukes of Auerstaedt
French military personnel of the French Revolutionary Wars
French Ministers of War
Grand Croix of the Légion d'honneur
Grand Crosses of the Military Order of Max Joseph
Grand Crosses of the Virtuti Militari
Knights of the Military Order of Christ
Marshals of France
Marshals of the First French Empire
Mayors of places in Île-de-France
Members of the Chamber of Peers of the Bourbon Restoration
Members of the Chamber of Peers of the Hundred Days
People from Yonne
Princes of Eckmühl
Names inscribed under the Arc de Triomphe
Recipients of the Order of the White Eagle (Poland)